North Chili is a hamlet in Chili, Monroe County, New York, United States. North Chili has a post office with ZIP code 14514, which opened on July 10, 1829.

References

Hamlets in Monroe County, New York
Hamlets in New York (state)